Typhoon Lupit, known in the Philippines as Typhoon Ramil was a late season and long-lived strong typhoon that formed in mid-October 2009. The storm caused no reported fatalities or major damages.

Meteorological history 

The convection had a broad circulation center that was beginning to consolidate in an area of low vertical windshear and favorable sea surface temperatures. Later that day, as the low-level circulation center had consolidated further, the JTWC released a tropical cyclone formation alert before early the next day both the JMA and the JTWC initiated advisories on the system as it had intensified into Tropical Depression 22W. During that day the depressions low-level circulation center continued to organize with deep convective bands starting to wrap into the center.

The convection was disorganised but was starting to consolidate around a broad low-level circulation center within a favourable environment to develop further with good vertical windshear and favourable sea surface temperatures. The disturbance rapidly developed throughout that day with a Tropical Cyclone Formation Alert issued later that day by the JTWC before advisories were initiated early the next day by the JMA and the JTWC who designated it as Tropical Depression 22W before the JTWC reported that the depression had intensified into a weak tropical storm. On October 15, JMA upgraded it to a Tropical Storm with the name Lupit. On the afternoon of next day, JTWC reported that Lupit strengthened into a Category 1 typhoon. That evening, PAGASA started issuing warnings on Lupit as it entered into their area of responsibility and assigned its local name, Ramil. At the same time JMA also upgraded Lupit into a typhoon. Intensification continued due to favorable conditions and hot water conditions, then by October 17, it rapidly intensified into a Category 3-equivalent typhoon. In the morning of the next day, it strengthened into a Category 4 typhoon, then strengthened further to Super Typhoon classification. On October 20, Lupit weakened to a minimal typhoon. By the 24th, dry air entrainment and an unfavorable environment had weakened Lupit further to a strong tropical storm, and caused the storm to change track from its westward drift to accelerate northeastward. Later that day, JTWC and PAGASA issued their final warning as Lupit was beginning extratropical transition. However, the JMA continued to issue warnings on Lupit until early on October 27.

Preparations and impact
Early on October 14, the National Weather Service Weather Forecast Office in Tiyan, Guam, placed Guam under a tropical storm watch as Lupit threatened to bring winds of at least 65 km/h, (40 mph), to Guam within 48 hours. However early the next day, NWS Guam canceled the tropical storm watch for Guam as Lupit had made its closest approach to Guam without causing any deaths or damages. Though the automated station at Apra Harbor observed gusts of 95 km/h, (60 mph), from brief lines of showers which were associated with Typhoon Lupit.

See also

 2009 Pacific typhoon season
 Timeline of the 2009 Pacific typhoon season
 Effects of the 2009 Pacific typhoon season in the Philippines

References

External links
Japan Meteorological Agency
Joint Typhoon Warning Center 
Philippine Atmospheric, Geophysical and Astronomical Services Administration
Digital Typhoon : Typhoon 200920 (LUPIT) - National Institute of Informatics

2009 Pacific typhoon season
Typhoons